Among the Missing is a 1934 American drama film directed by Albert S. Rogell and starring Richard Cromwell, Henrietta Crosman and Billie Seward.

Cast

 Richard Cromwell as Tommy aka The Kid
 Henrietta Crosman as Aunt Martha Abbott
 Billie Seward as Judy
 Arthur Hohl as Gordon
 Ivan F. Simpson as Smeed
 Ben Taggart as Police Officer Flannagan 
 Wade Boteler as Detective Rogers
 Harry C. Bradley as Alvin Abbott
 Claire Du Brey as Mrs. Alvin Abbott
 Douglas Cosgrove as Police Captain Drake
 Paul Hurst as Police Capt. Bill Connors
 Joseph Crehan as Detective O'Malley
 George Guhl as Detective Jones
 Kathrin Clare Ward as Mrs. Bull - Scrubwoman
 Vessie Farrell as Mrs. Hunter - Scrubwoman
 John M. Sullivan as Judge 
 Fred Kelsey as Police Sgt. Murphy
 Gladys Gale as Mrs. Randall
 Cyril Thornton as Brennan
 Lee Phelps as Detective Gaynor
 Delmar Watson as First Boy
 Bobby Caldwell as Second Boy
 Tom McGuire as Detective
 Lew Meehan as Detective
 Lee Shumway as  Detective 
 Billy Sullivan as Court Clerk
 Blanche Payson as Police Matron
 Jack Mower as Police Radio Broadcaster

References

Bibliography
 Matlin, Leonard. Turner Classic Movies Presents Leonard Maltin's Classic Movie Guide: From the Silent Era Through 1965: Third Edition. Penguin,  2015.
 Rainey, Buck. Sweethearts of the Sage: Biographies and Filmographies of 258 actresses appearing in Western movies. McFarland & Company, 1992.

External links
 

1934 films
1934 drama films
American drama films
Films directed by Albert S. Rogell
American black-and-white films
Columbia Pictures films
1930s English-language films
1930s American films